Duality is an album by guitarist Peter Leitch and pianist John Hicks that was recorded in 1994.

Recording and music
The album was recorded at Rudy Van Gelder Studio, Englewood Cliffs, New Jersey, on June 1 and 2, 1994. It is a duet album played by guitarist Peter Leitch and pianist John Hicks. The material is a mix of standards, relatively unknown compositions, and pieces written by each of the musicians.

Release and reception

Duality was released by Reservoir Records. The AllMusic reviewer concluded that "Leitch, a lyrical player in the style of Jim Hall, is beautifully complemented by Hicks' piano technique."

Track listing
"Pas De Trois" – 7:11
"Epistrophy" – 6:23
"For B.C." – 6:45
"H&L" – 7:13
"O'Grand Amour" – 8:59
"Dancing in the Dark" – 5:21
"Last Night when We Were Young" – 5:00
"Duality" – 6:32
"After the Morning" – 6:52
"Chelsea Bridge" – 4:49
"I Hear a Rhapsody" – 5:58

Personnel
 Peter Leitch – guitar
 John Hicks – piano

References

1994 albums
John Hicks (jazz pianist) albums
Reservoir Records albums
Collaborative albums